Heytesbury railway station is a former railway station near Heytesbury, Wiltshire, England, in the Wylye Valley, about three miles south of Warminster.

The station serving Heytesbury opened on 30 June 1856, on the Salisbury branch line of the Great Western Railway next to the bridge carrying the minor road to Tytherington. Originally just a single track, the line was doubled eastwards in 1899 and then westwards to Warminster the following year. The original platform became the one used by trains towards Salisbury and a second was added with a small waiting shelter when the line was doubled, but there was never a footbridge between the two platforms. A goods shed was situated on the north side of the line to the east of the passenger facilities.

A  branch line from the west end of the station was in use from about 1916 to 1926 to serve a military camp and hospital at Sutton Veny.

The station closed on 19 September 1955 but the signal box, which was opposite the goods shed, remained open until May 1968. The original station building is still standing.

The whole station was destroyed apart from the station building is still there to this day.

References

 

Disused railway stations in Wiltshire
Former Great Western Railway stations
Railway stations in Great Britain opened in 1856
Railway stations in Great Britain closed in 1955